SITE Design Group is a consulting firm specializing in landscape architecture, urban planning and skateparks. Based in Solana Beach, California, the firm operates worldwide and has overseen the creation of over 100 parks.

Work 

Etnies Skatepark of Lake Forest
Mat Hoffman Action Sports Park of Oklahoma City with BMX professional Mat Hoffman
Backyard skatepark for professional skateboarder Tony Hawk
Far Rockaway Skatepark
Vans' Off the Wall Skatepark in Huntington Beach, California
Linda Vista Skatepark in San Diego
Chandler Park Skatepark in Detroit
Pier 62 Skate Park in Hudson River Park, New York

See also
List of skateparks
Grindline Skateparks

References

American landscape architects
American urban planners
Architecture firms based in California
Skateparks
Solana Beach, California